MV Seabourn Ovation is a cruise ship owned by Seabourn Cruise Line. The ship was ordered at Fincantieri in December 2014. The construction started on 7 June 2016. The keel was laid on 2 December 2016 in Sestri Ponente (Genoa).

Seabourn Ovation was officially delivered to her owner on April 27, 2018. After setting sail from Genoa, she was christened on May 11 in the port of Valletta, Malta by British singer and actress Elaine Paige. The lyricist Tim Rice wrote a song specifically for the occasion. The ship will spend her inaugural season in Europe.

The ship is the fifth to be delivered to her owners in the last decade. It has 300 suites, each with a balcony. Over 1,600 works of art, by 120 artists, are displayed aboard the ship.

References

External links 
 Galapagos Legend

2017 ships
Ships built in Italy
Ships built by Fincantieri
Ovatzion